The Rivière à Dupuis is a tributary of the Chiskal River, flowing in the unorganized territory of Rivière-Nipissis, in the Sept-Rivières Regional County Municipality, in the administrative region of Côte-Nord, in the province of Quebec (Canada).

Geography 
The course of the Dupuis river generally descends towards the south-east, between the Petite rivière au Bouleau (located on the west side) and the Bouleau River (located on the east side).

The Dupuis river takes its source from an unidentified lake, in the unorganized territory of Rivière-Nipissis. The mouth of the head lake is located at the end of a bay southeast of the lake, either at:
  southwest of a bend in the Chiskal River;
  southeast of a bay in Nipisso Lake;
  northeast of downtown Sept-Îles.

  towards the south, in particular crossing a lake, up to a bend river corresponding to a stream (coming from the west);
  towards the northeast, crossing an unidentified lake, up to at its mouth;
  towards the northeast almost in a straight line, collecting the discharge (coming from the north) of three lakes, the discharge (coming from the southwest) of two lakes and the discharge (coming from the northwest) of a lake, as well as down the mountain, to its mouth.

The Dupuis river flows into a bend in the river on the west bank of the Bouleau river. This confluence is located at:
  west of the course of the Bouleau river;
  north-east of the course of the Matamec River;
  west of the center of the village of Rivière-au-Tonnerre;
  northeast of downtown Sept-Îles.

Toponymy 
The term "Dupuis" turns out to be a family name of French origin.

The toponym "rivière à Dupuis" was made official on December 5, 1968.

See also 

 List of rivers of Quebec

References 

Rivers of Côte-Nord
Sept-Rivières Regional County Municipality